In mathematics, given an action  of a group scheme G on a scheme X over a base scheme S, an equivariant sheaf F on X is a sheaf of -modules together with the isomorphism of -modules

  

that satisfies the cocycle condition: writing m for multiplication,
.

Notes on the definition 
On the stalk level, the cocycle condition says that the isomorphism  is the same as the composition ; i.e., the associativity of the group action. The condition that the unit of the group acts as the identity is also a consequence: apply  to both sides to get  and so  is the identity.

Note that  is an additional data; it is "a lift" of the action of G on X to the sheaf F. Moreover, when G is a connected algebraic group,  F an invertible sheaf and X is reduced, the cocycle condition is automatic: any isomorphism  automatically satisfies the cocycle condition (this fact is noted at the end of the proof of Ch. 1, § 3., Proposition 1.5. of Mumford's "geometric invariant theory.")

If the action of G is free, then the notion of an equivariant sheaf simplifies to a sheaf on the quotient X/G, because of the descent along torsors.

.

There is also a definition of equivariant sheaves in terms of simplicial sheaves. Alternatively, one can define an equivariant sheaf to be an equivariant object in the category of, say, coherent sheaves.

Linearized line bundles 
A structure of an equivariant sheaf on an invertible sheaf or a line bundle is also called a linearization.

Let X be a complete variety over an algebraically closed field acted by a connected reductive group G and L an invertible sheaf on it. If X is normal, then some tensor power  of L is linearizable.

Tensor products and the inverses of linearized invertible sheaves are again linearized in the natural way. Thus, the isomorphism classes of the linearized invertible sheaves on a scheme X form an abelian group. There is a homomorphism to the Picard group of X which forgets the linearization; this homomorphism is neither injective nor surjective in general, and its kernel can be identified with the isomorphism classes of linearizations of the trivial line bundle. 

Dual action on sections of equivariant sheaves 
Given an algebraic group G and a G-equivariant sheaf F on X over a field k, let  be the space of global sections. It then admits the structure of a G-module; i.e., V is a linear representation of G as follows. Writing  for the group action, for each g in G and v in V, let

Example: take  and  the action of G on itself. Then ,  and
,
meaning  is the left regular representation of G.

The representation  defined above is a rational representation: for each vector v in V, there is a finite-dimensional G-submodule of V that contains v.

Equivariant vector bundle 
A definition is simpler for a vector bundle (i.e., a variety corresponding to a locally free sheaf of constant rank). We say a vector bundle E on an algebraic variety X acted by an algebraic group G is equivariant if G acts fiberwise: i.e.,  is a "linear" isomorphism of vector spaces. In other words, an equivariant vector bundle is a pair consisting of a vector bundle and the lifting of the action  to that of  so that the projection  is equivariant.

Just like in the non-equivariant setting, one can define an equivariant characteristic class of an equivariant vector bundle.

Examples 
 The tangent bundle of a manifold or a smooth variety is an equivariant vector bundle.
 The sheaf of equivariant differential forms.
 Let G be a semisimple algebraic group, and λ:H→C a character on a maximal torus H. It extends to a Borel subgroup λ:B→C, giving a one dimensional representation Wλ of B. Then GxWλ is a trivial vector bundle over G on which B acts. The quotient Lλ=GxBWλ by the action of B is a line bundle over the flag variety G/B. Note that G→G/B is a B bundle, so this is just an example of the associated bundle construction. The Borel–Weil–Bott theorem says that all representations of G arise as the cohomologies of such line bundles.
 If X=Spec(A) is an affine scheme, a Gm-action on X is the same thing as a Z grading on A. Similarly, a Gm equivariant quasicoherent sheaf on X is the same thing as a Z graded A module.

See also 
 Equivariant algebraic K-theory
 Equivariant bundle
 Equivariant cohomology
 Quotient stack

Notes

References 
 J. Bernstein, V. Lunts, "Equivariant sheaves and functors," Springer Lecture Notes in Math. 1578 (1994).

External links 
Equivariant sheaves

Scheme theory